Northern Catalan, also known as Rossellonese (rossellonès), is a Catalan dialect mostly spoken in Northern Catalonia (roughly corresponding with the region of Roussillon), but also extending in the northeast part of Southern Catalonia in a transition zone with Central Catalan. All speakers of Catalan from North Catalonia are at least natively bilingual with French.

Phonetics 
Phonetic features of Northern Catalan include:

It has only five stressed vowels, the smallest number of any Catalan dialect: . In some local varieties  can also be found.

There are some instances of historic stressed  that has changed to : Canigó > Canigú.

Morphology 
Some subdialects keep the singular masculine definite article lo, as in North-Western Catalan and many varieties of Occitan.

Northern Catalan has a large body of words imported from French and Occitan. It also features some grammatical forms and structures that are typical of Occitan, such as the use of a lone post-verbal pas, rather than a lone preverbal no to express basic negation (Northern Catalan canti pas vs. Central Catalan no canto, 'I don't sing' or 'I'm not singing'); pas is also used in some other Catalan dialects for emphasis but always with no before the verb (Central Catalan no canto pas, 'I do not sing' or 'I am not singing').

Notes

References

Catalan dialects
Linguistic rights
Pyrénées-Orientales